Istros Bay is the 3.2 km wide bay indenting for 1.4 km the east coast of Clarence Island in the South Shetland Islands, Antarctica.  It is entered north of Lebed Point and south of Sugarloaf Island, and has its head fed by Highton Glacier.  Istros is the ancient name for the lower Danube River.

Location
British mapping in 1972 and 2009.

Maps
British Antarctic Territory. Scale 1:200000 topographic map. DOS 610 Series, Sheet W 61 54. Directorate of Overseas Surveys, Tolworth, UK, 1972.
South Shetland Islands: Elephant, Clarence and Gibbs Islands. Scale 1:220000 topographic map. UK Antarctic Place-names Committee, 2009.
 Antarctic Digital Database (ADD). Scale 1:250000 topographic map of Antarctica. Scientific Committee on Antarctic Research (SCAR). Since 1993, regularly upgraded and updated.

References
 Bulgarian Antarctic Gazetteer. Antarctic Place-names Commission. (details in Bulgarian, basic data in English)
 Istros Bay. SCAR Composite Gazetteer of Antarctica

External links
 Istros Bay. Copernix satellite image

Bays of the South Shetland Islands
Bulgaria and the Antarctic